Vioolsdrif is a village on the Orange River in the north-western Namaqualand area of South Africa.

Origin of name 
The name in Afrikaans means 'the ford (shallow river crossing) of the violin'. It is reportedly named after Jan Viool ("John Violin"), who is said to have played the fiddle in these parts in the nineteenth century. Some say he was a Nama man, who used to guide ox-wagons across the ford. An accomplished player, he would fiddle away merrily on the river bank while waiting for wagons to arrive. These claims await elaboration.

Geography 

A road bridge here on the N7 national road links South Africa with Namibia and the town is the South African border post. At the other end of the bridge is the small Namibian village of Noordoewer (meaning "north bank" in  Afrikaans). The area is profoundly arid and the crossing is overlooked by steep and spectacular sandstone cliffs hundreds of metres in height.

In general, the surrounding region is almost unpopulated. There are small pockets of fertile alluvial soil along the course of the river and these are used for growing crops, such as dates and melons, under irrigation.

Tourism
Vioolsdrif has several campsites and motels for motorists passing through the border. Many tour operators have set up their base camps for rafting tours on the Orange River.

Climate
There are two seasons. The short winter season lasts from about May to July. Almost no rain falls and the weather is hot. The summer season lasts from August to April. It is very hot and there is no rain whatsoever.

References

Namibia–South Africa border crossings
Orange River
Populated places in the Nama Khoi Local Municipality